Dan Schooff (born December 10, 1971) is a former American Democratic politician from Wisconsin.

Born in Beloit, Wisconsin, Schooff graduated from Beloit Catholic High School. In 1994, Schooff graduated from University of Wisconsin–Madison and was a businessman. He served in the Wisconsin State Assembly from 1997 until he resigned in 2004.

Notes

Politicians from Beloit, Wisconsin
 University of Wisconsin–Madison alumni
1971 births
Living people
21st-century American politicians
Democratic Party members of the Wisconsin State Assembly